Flower Box is an album by Anders Osborne that was unexpectedly released in 2016 on Back on Dumaine Records. It was the second of two albums released by Osborne in 2016, the first album being Spacedust & Ocean Views. Rex Thomson from Live for Live Music quotes that "listening to it is like finding money… you didn’t know it was coming, but your world is a happier place for its arrival. Dripping in southern blues and fuzz box guitars, Osborne and his band hit all the right notes, even if they take their time getting there."

Track listing 
All songs were written by Anders Osborne.

Personnel
Mark Howard, Anders Osborne & Chad Cromwell - Producing
Mark Howard - Mixing & Engineering
Justin Tocket, Mark Pollack, & Nick Guttmann - Additional Engineers
Phil Frank - Guitar Tech
Anders Osborne- Vocals, Guitars
Carl Dufrene Jr. - Bass, Vocals
Brady L. Brade Jr. - Drums, Percussion
Chad Cromwell - Drums, Percussion 
Marc Broussard - Vocals
Scott Metzger - Guitars
David LaBruyere - Bass
Justin Tocket - Vocals
Rob McNelley - Guitars

References

2016 albums
Anders Osborne albums